Megacyllene unicolor is a species of beetle in the family Cerambycidae. It was described by Ernst Fuchs in 1955.

References

Megacyllene
Beetles described in 1955